Chester Business Park is located to the south of the city of Chester, Cheshire, England and is sited to the east of Wrexham Road (A483) and to the north of the Chester southerly bypass (A55).

At the centre of the site is the former Wrexham Road Farm, a model farm designed by John Douglas for the 1st Duke of Westminster and built in 1877–84; otherwise it was a greenfield site. The farmhouse and outbuildings of the farm were converted into offices, and a number of businesses built premises in modern architectural styles. One of the first major businesses to occupy a new building was Shell Chemicals U.K., and other businesses included Marks & Spencer Financial Services, MBNA International Bank, Bristol-Myers Squibb, and Trinity International.

A Leaping Salmon bronze sculpture by Laurence Broderick is displayed at the Chester Business Park.

References

External links
Business Directory of the companies currently located in the park

1988 establishments in England
Business parks of England
Economy of Cheshire